Alperstein (Jewish (Ashkenazic): variant of Halpern with the addition of German stein "rock") is a surname. Notable people with the surname include:

 Avraham Eliezer Alperstein (1853–1917), American Orthodox rabbi
 Paul Alperstein, founder the American Wrestling Federation

See also 
 Alberstein

Jewish surnames
German toponymic surnames